The London Sevens is played annually as part of the IRB Sevens World Series for international rugby sevens (seven a side version of rugby union). The 2007 competition, which took place on 26 and 27 May, was held at Twickenham and was part of the 2006–07 IRB Sevens World Series.

New Zealand were overall winners, defeating defending series champions and current 2006-07 leaders Fiji 29–7 in the Cup final. However, the Fijians put themselves in good position to win the overall season crown; they only need make the Cup semifinals in the final event, the Edinburgh Sevens, to successfully defend their season title.

Pool Stages

Pool A

|width=10| 
|Results
 Fiji 19-19 Argentina
 France 24-7 Russia
 Fiji 62-0 Russia
 France 12-24 Argentina
 Argentina 50-0 Russia
 Fiji 21-19 France
|}

Pool B

|width=10| 
|Results
 Samoa 34-5 Canada
 Australia 36-0 Georgia
 Samoa 43-5 Georgia
 Australia 24-19 Canada
 Canada 26-5 Georgia
 Samoa 17-7 Australia
|}

Pool C

|width=10| 
|Results
 New Zealand 43-10 Kenya
 Scotland 19-0 Italy
 New Zealand 48-0 Italy
 Scotland 19-19 Kenya
 Kenya 5-29 Italy
 New Zealand 43-7 Scotland
|}

Pool D

|width=10| 
|Results
 South Africa 24-14 Wales
 England 19-14 Portugal
 South Africa 17-12 Portugal
 England 0-22 Wales
 Wales 15-14 Portugal
 South Africa 14-17 England
|}

Finals

 1/4 final Bowl -  31-0 
 1/4 final Bowl -  19-0 
 1/4 final Bowl -  0-5 
 1/4 final Bowl -  5-19 
 1/4 final Cup -  26-10 
 1/4 final Cup -  15-5 
 1/4 final Cup -  14-0 
 1/4 final Cup -  39-10 
 SF Shield -  0-19 
 SF Shield -  17-12 (aet) 
 SF Bowl -  7-17 
 SF Bowl -  19-12 
 SF Plate -  15-5 
 SF Plate -  17-14 
 SF Cup -  24-7 
 SF Cup -  19-0 
 Final Shield -  15-0 
 Final Bowl -  10-0  
 Final Plate -  5-14 
 Final Cup -  7-29

Round 7 table

External links 
London Sevens Profile on UR7s.com

London
Sevens
London Sevens
London
London Sevens